This is a list of ports and harbours in Scotland based on Department for Transport data.

See also
List of RNLI stations#Scotland Division
List of ports and harbours of the Atlantic Ocean#United Kingdom
List of North Sea ports#United Kingdom
List of marinas#Scotland

References

 
Scotland
Ports and harbours
Ports and harbours
Ports and harbours